The Prussian Homage or Prussian Tribute was the formal investment of Albert of Prussia as duke of the Polish fief of Ducal Prussia.

In the aftermath of the armistice ending the Polish-Teutonic War Albert, Grand Master of the Teutonic Knights and a member of the House of Hohenzollern, visited Martin Luther at Wittenberg and soon thereafter became sympathetic to Protestantism. On 10 April 1525, two days after signing of the Treaty of Kraków which officially ended the Polish–Teutonic War (1519–21), in the main square of the Polish capital Kraków, Albert resigned his position as Grand Master of the Teutonic Knights and received the title "Duke of Prussia" from King Zygmunt I the Old of Poland. In the deal, partially brokered by Luther, the Duchy of Prussia became the first Protestant state, anticipating the Peace of Augsburg of 1555. The investiture of a Protestant fief of Duchy of Prussia was better for Poland for strategic reasons than a Catholic fief of State of Teutonic Order in Prussia, formally subject to the Holy Roman Emperor and the Papacy. 

As a symbol of vassalage, Albert received a standard with the Prussian coat of arms from the Polish king. The black Prussian eagle on the flag was augmented with a letter "S" (for Sigismundus) and had a crown placed around its neck as a symbol of loyalty to Poland.

Earlier homages of Grand Masters of the Teutonic Knights 
The tradition of Prussian Homages dates back to the year 1469, when, after the Thirteen Years' War, and the Second Peace of Thorn, all Grand Masters of the Teutonic Knights were obliged to pay homage to Polish rulers within six months of their election. Some Grand Masters refused to do so, claiming that the Teutonic Knights were under Papal sovereignty. Among those who refused were Martin Truchseß von Wetzhausen, Frederick of Saxony (who referred the matter to the 1495 Imperial Diet), as well as Duke Albert. 
 1 December 1469 at a Sejm in Piotrków Trybunalski, Grand Master Heinrich Reuß von Plauen paid homage to King Casimir IV Jagiellon,
 20 November 1470, at a Sejm in Piotrków Trybunalski, Grand Master Heinrich Reffle von Richtenberg and Conrad Von Wilczyński paid homage to King Casimir IV,
 9 October 1479 at Nowy Korczyn, Grand Master Martin Truchseß von Wetzhausen paid homage to King Casimir IV,
 18 November 1489 at Radom, Grand Master Johann von Tiefen paid homage to King Casimir IV,
 29 May 1493, Grand Master Johann von Tieffen paid homage to King John I Albert.

Subsequent homages of Dukes of Prussia 
The Duchy of Prussia was created in 1525, and the homage of Duke Albert of Prussia took place on 10 April 1525 at Kraków. The last homage took place on 6 October 1641 in front of the Warsaw's Royal Castle. Following the Treaty of Bromberg (1657), Prussian rulers were no longer regarded as vassals of Polish kings.
 19 July 1569 at a Sejm in Lublin, Duke Albert Frederick paid homage to King Sigismund II Augustus. This event was observed, among others, by Jan Kochanowski, who described it in a poem Proporzec albo hołd pruski,
 20 February 1578 in front of Warsaw's St. Anne's Church, George Frederick, Margrave of Brandenburg-Ansbach paid homage to King Stephen Báthory,
 16 November 1611 in front of Warsaw's St. Anne's Church, John Sigismund, Elector of Brandenburg paid homage to King Sigismund III Vasa,
 in September 1621, George William, Elector of Brandenburg paid homage to King Sigismund III,
 21 March 1633, envoys of Elector George William paid homage to King Władysław IV Vasa,
 6 October 1641 in front of Warsaw's Royal Castle, Frederick William, Elector of Brandenburg paid homage to King Władysław IV.

References 
 Vetulani A., Lenno pruskie od traktatu krakowskiego do śmierci księcia Albrechta 1525-1568. Studium historyczno-prawne, Kraków 1930;
 Marian Biskup, Geneza i znaczenie hołdu pruskiego 1525 r., "Komunikaty Mazursko-Warmińskie", 1975, nr 4;
 Bogucka M., Hołd Pruski, Warszawa 1982;
 Boockman H., Zakon krzyżacki. Dwanaście rozdziałów jego historii, wyd. polskie, Warszawa 1998
 Bogdan Wachowiak, Andrzej Kamieński Dzieje Brandenburgii-Prus. Na progu czasów nowożytnych (1500-1701) ;

1525 in Poland
Ceremonies
History of Kraków
History of Prussia
Germany–Poland relations

de:Preußische Huldigung